

Overview
Australia's weather radars are operated by the Bureau of Meteorology, an executive agency of the Australian Government. The radar network is continually being upgraded with new technology such as doppler and dual polarisation to provide better now-casting. Doppler radars are able to detect the movement of precipitation, making it very useful in detecting damaging winds associated with precipitation, and determining if a thunderstorm has a rotating updraft, a key indicator of the presence of the most dangerous type of thunderstorm, a supercell. 

The new dual polarisation radars give forecasters the ability to:
Detect debris in the atmosphere, leading to more accurate tornado warnings;
Distinguish between different precipitation types, leading to better estimations of hail size and severity;
Better identify areas of heavy rainfall, leading to more accurate flood warnings;
Discern between precipitation and non-meteorological echoes such as chaff, birds, and insects.

The Dual Polarisation Transition 
The transition to polarimetric (dual-polarised) radars began in 2017 with the upgrade of 4 Meteor 1500 radars located in Melbourne, Brisbane, Adelaide, and Sydney. The network has further been enhanced through the installation of 8 new polarimetric Meteor 735 radars across WA, NSW & Victoria, and a polarimetric WRM200 radar manufactured by Vaisala to replace the radar in Dampier, WA which had been destroyed by severe tropical cyclone Damien in 2020. 4 new Meteor 1700's were also installed in 2021/22, 3 located in QLD, and 1 in Perth, WA, all equipped with dual polarisation technology. All the radars with the model name 'Meteor' were manufactured by Selex ES, now Leonardo.

Future plans 
The BoM has plans to;
Add a new radar in Tennant Creek, NT.
Replace the Marburg radar in SE QLD.
Move the existing Moree radar in NSW further north to better cover SE QLD. 
Upgrade the Carnarvon radar in WA.
Build a new radar in the Toowomba region in SE QLD. 
Upgrade the Giles radar in WA.
Upgrade the Hobart Airport radar in TAS.
Upgrade the Bowen radar in QLD.
Upgrade the Grafton radar in NSW.
Upgrade the Canberra Captains Flat radar located in NSW.
Current plans can be found at

Australian Capital Territory 
The Australian Capital Territory is served by the Captains Flat radar, located in New South Wales (see below).

New South Wales

Northern Territory

Queensland

South Australia

Tasmania

Victoria

Western Australia

Research Radars 
Note: 
The Bureau of Meteorology operated the CP2 and CPOL radars before they were decommissioned. 
The CSIRO currently operates the Ocean Pol radar aboard the RV Investigator but the BoM is still involved with research regarding it. 
The UQHAIL radar is operated by a team at the University of Queensland.

References

See also

Related articles 
 NEXRAD
 Canadian weather radar network

External links 

Bureau of Meteorology
Weather radar networks